Cardiff Council, formally the County Council of the City and County of Cardiff is the governing body for Cardiff, one of the Principal Areas of Wales. The principal area and its council were established in 1996 to replace the previous Cardiff City Council which had been a lower-tier authority within South Glamorgan. Cardiff Council consists of 79 councillors, representing 28 electoral wards.

Labour has held a majority of the seats on the council since 2012. The last election was in May 2022 and the next election is due in 2027.

History
Municipal life in Cardiff dates back to the 12th century, when Cardiff was granted borough status by the Earls of Gloucester. The offices of the mayor, aldermen, and common councillors developed during the Middle Ages. When elected county councils were established in 1889 under the Local Government Act 1888, Cardiff was considered large enough to run its own services and so it became a county borough, independent from Glamorgan County Council. The town of Cardiff was still considered the county town of Glamorgan, with Glamorgan County Council building its headquarters there. Cardiff was one of only two county boroughs in Wales created in 1889, the other being Swansea. (Newport was later elevated to county borough status in 1891, followed by Merthyr Tydfil in 1908.) In 1905, Cardiff became a city, and thereafter Cardiff County Borough Council was allowed to call itself Cardiff City Council.

In 1974 local government across Wales and England was restructured into a two-tier system under the Local Government Act 1972. Cardiff became a lower-tier district council, called Cardiff City Council, within the new county of South Glamorgan. The South Glamorgan County Council provided county-level services in the area.

Further local government restructuring in 1996 under the Local Government (Wales) Act 1994 saw the city of Cardiff become a unitary authority: the present Cardiff Council. South Glamorgan County Council was abolished. Ahead of the reforms the county council had campaigned for a new "Greater Cardiff" authority to reflect the boundaries of South Glamorgan, but the Conservative government of the time decided to keep the Vale of Glamorgan (which covered a marginal Conservative parliamentary seat) separate from Cardiff.

The 1994 Act directed that the new council should be called "Cardiff County Council". The council's constitution calls it instead the "County Council of the City and County of Cardiff". For most purposes the council styles itself "Cardiff Council", except where the full legal name is required, when it uses the form from its constitution.

Political control
The first election to the reconstituted council was held in 1995, initially operating as a shadow authority alongside the outgoing authorities until it came into its powers on 1 April 1996. Political control of the council since 1996 has been held by the following parties:

Leadership

The role of Lord Mayor of Cardiff is largely ceremonial. Political leadership is provided instead by the leader of the council, although the two roles were temporarily combined between 1999 and 2003. The first leader following the 1996 reforms was Russell Goodway, who had been the last leader of South Glamorgan County Council. The leaders of Cardiff Council since 1996 have been:

At the age of 31, Huw Thomas became Wales' youngest council leader when he was elected in May 2017.

Current composition 
As of 14 March 2023.

Party with majority control in bold.

Elections
Since 2012, Cardiff Council elections have taken place every five years.

The council was run by a Labour majority administration between 1995 and 2004. The Liberal Democrats ran a minority administration from 2004, in coalition with Plaid Cymru.

Following the 2008 local elections in Cardiff there was still no party with an overall majority. The Lib Dems increased their total number of councillors to 35, forming an administration with Plaid Cymru, with Rodney Berman as leader of the Council. The Conservatives replaced Labour as the official opposition. Labour suffered badly, losing 14 councillors.  Plaid Cymru gained four councillors. Three independent councillors were elected; two former Conservatives who had left the group in 2006 being joined by an additional member.

In 2012, the Labour Party took overall control of the council, and remained in overall control following the 2017 and 2022 elections.

Party with the most elected councillors in bold. Coalition agreements in notes column.

Premises

The council's main offices are at County Hall on Atlantic Wharf. It was built in 1987 as the headquarters of the former South Glamorgan County Council. The council also uses the City Hall on Cathays Park in the city centre, built in 1906 for the former Cardiff City Council. Full council meetings were held at County Hall prior to 2020, when the COVID-19 pandemic required meetings to be held virtually. From the resumption of in-person meetings in May 2022, full council meetings have been held at City Hall.

Electoral wards

Since the 2022 elections, the unitary authority area has been divided into 28 electoral wards. Many of these wards are coterminous with communities of the same name. The following table lists council wards, communities and associated geographical areas. Communities with a community council are indicated with an asterisk.

Arms

See also
City Hall, Cardiff
County Hall, Cardiff
Cardiff Bay
Flat Holm

References

External links

List of Mayors and other secular officials of Cardiff (British History Online)

Politics of Cardiff
Local authorities of Wales
1996 establishments in Wales